This was the first edition of the tournament.

Sander Arends and Adil Shamasdin won the title after defeating Ariel Behar and Miguel Ángel Reyes-Varela 6–2, 6–1 in the final.

Seeds

Draw

References
 Main Draw

Braga Open - Doubles
Braga